The House of Drăculești were one of two major rival lines of Wallachian voivodes of the House of Basarab, the other being the House of Dănești. These lines were in constant contest for the throne from the late fourteenth to the early sixteenth centuries. Descendants of the line of Drăculești would eventually come to dominate the principality, until its common rule with Transylvania and Moldavia by Mihai Viteazul in 1600.

Etymology 
The line of the Drăculești began with Vlad II, the Dragon, son of one of the most important rulers of the Basarab dynasty, Mircea the Elder. According to some historians, the name Drăculești is derived from the membership of Vlad II, Dracul (in Old Romanian and related languages, drac meant "dragon") in the Order of the Dragon (founded in 1408 A.D.). The Order's purpose was to make a strong solidarity among Central and South-Eastern Europe's Christians, in their fight against Ottoman and Tartar (from the Golden Horde and Crimean Khanate) Muslims.

Members of the Drăculești line
Members of the Drăculești line who held the throne of Wallachia include the following:

Trașcă Drăculescu – Wallachian boyar, inhabitant of Oltenia, the "last legitimate" descendent of the dynasty, who died in the 18th century.

See also
 List of rulers of Wallachia

Notes

Sources
 Constantin C.Giurescu – Istoria românilor vol. II, Editura științifică și enciclopedică, București 1976

External links

 
 
People of medieval Romania
Medieval Wallachia
History of Wallachia (1512–1714)